The Parsons code, formally named the Parsons code for melodic contours, is a simple notation used to identify a piece of music through melodic motion — movements of the pitch up and down. Denys Parsons developed this system for his 1975 book The Directory of Tunes and Musical Themes. Representing a melody in this manner makes it easier to index or search for pieces, particularly when the notes' values are unknown. Parsons covered around 15,000 classical, popular and folk pieces in his dictionary. In the process he found out that *UU is the most popular opening contour, used in 23% of all the themes, something that applies to all the genres. 

The book was also published in Germany in 2002 and reissued by Piatkus in 2008 as the Directory of Classical Themes.

An earlier method of classifying and indexing melody was devised by Harold Barlow and Sam Morgenstern in A Dictionary of Musical Themes (1950).

The code
The first note of a melody is denoted with an asterisk (*), although some Parsons code users omit the first note. All succeeding notes are denoted with one of three letters to indicate the relationship of its pitch to the previous note:
* = first tone as reference,
u = "up", for when the note is higher than the previous note,
d = "down", for when the note is lower than the previous note,
r = "repeat", for when the note has the same pitch as the previous note.

Some examples 

"Twinkle Twinkle Little Star": *
"Silent Night": *
"Aura Lea" ("Love Me Tender"): *
"White Christmas": *
First verse in Madonna's "Like a Virgin": *

See also
 List of music software

References

Editions

External links
Themefinder allows searching musical themes by Parsons Code (called "Gross Contour" on the search page).
"The Open Music Encyclopedia" uses Parsons code for encoding songs in their database
FolkTuneFinder.com uses Parsons code (amongst other methods) to search a database of folk tunes.

Musical notation
Melody